Koruni (also Romanized as Korūnī) is a village in Qarah Bagh Rural District, in the Central District of Shiraz County, Fars Province, Iran. At the 2006 census, its population was 2,037, in 525 families.

See also 
 Kuruni (tribe)
 Korouni dialect

References 

Populated places in Shiraz County